Antonis Rigopoulos (born 10 June 2004) is a Greek professional footballer who plays as a left-back for Super League 2 club Makedonikos.

References

2004 births
Living people
Greek footballers
Super League Greece players
Super League Greece 2 players
Apollon Smyrnis F.C. players
Olympiacos Volos F.C. players
Makedonikos F.C. players
Association football defenders